Olearia mooneyi, commonly known as pumpkin bush, is a species of flowering plant in the family Asteraceae and is endemic to Lord Howe Island. It is a shrub or small tree with hairy, elliptic to egg-shaped leaves with the narrower end towards the base, and white and pale yellow, daisy-like inflorescences.

Description
The upper surface of the leaves is glabrous, green and shiny, the lower surface pale brown and covered with fine woolly hairs. Flowering occurs from November to January and the fruit is a hairy brown achene, the pappus with about twenty bristles.

Taxonomy
Pumpkin bush was first formally described in 1874 by Ferdinand von Mueller who gave it the name Aster mooneyi in Fragmenta Phytographiae Australiae from specimens collected by "Lind" and Fullagar on the summits of Mount Lidgbird and Mount Gower. In 1896, William Hemsley changed the name to Olearia mooneyi. The specific epithet honours Thomas Mooney (1842–1873), an early settler of Lord Howe Island who was interested in its plants. Mooney arrived on the island in 1867 but was lost at sea in 1873.

Distribution and habitat
Olearia mooneyi is endemic to Lord Howe Island on mountains where it is the dominant tree above .

References

Asterales of Australia
mooneyi
Endemic flora of Lord Howe Island
Plants described in 1874
Taxa named by Ferdinand von Mueller
Flora of New South Wales